"It's Called a Heart" is a song by English electronic music band Depeche Mode, released as a single on 16 September 1985. "It's Called a Heart" was one of two new songs on the 1985 compilation albums The Singles 81→85 and Catching Up with Depeche Mode, along with the band's other single "Shake the Disease".

Background
The song was included as one of two new tracks on the compilation The Singles 81→85 the same year, along with "Shake the Disease". The song reached number 18 on the UK Singles Chart. The US version of The Singles 81→85, Catching Up with Depeche Mode, also includes the B-side, "Fly on the Windscreen", which reappeared in a slightly different mix on the band's 1986 album Black Celebration.

Unlike most other Depeche Mode singles, no limited edition ("L12 Bong") version was released for "It's Called a Heart". Instead, there was a double 12-inch vinyl ("D12 Bong") that featured both the standard 12-inch version and the 12-inch remix.

Both Martin Gore and Alan Wilder have cited "It's Called a Heart" as one of their least favourite tracks the band had ever recorded.

In a documentary included in the remastered edition of the Black Celebration album, it is revealed that there was some internal debate between Depeche Mode and Mute Records as to which song was to be the A-side on what would eventually become the 'It's Called a Heart' single release. The group initially wished to release 'Fly On The Windscreen' as a single but were denied due to the input of a Mute Records publicist who found its use of the word "death" in the leading line of the song too problematic for serious contention as a single. Debate ensued, in which Alan Wilder rigorously argued in favour of flipping 'Fly On The Windscreen' to the A-side. Wilder was outvoted due to the input of Dave Gahan, Martin Gore, Andrew Fletcher, Daniel Miller, and Neil Ferris of Ferret & Spanner, a P.R. firm who promoted records in the United Kingdom for Mute Records, who each argued in favour of releasing 'It's Called A Heart' as the A-side. As a result, 'It's Called A Heart' was released as the A-side on Depeche Mode's fourteenth UK single on September 16th, 1985, with the 5:03 version of 'Fly On The Windscreen' as the B-side. The 'Final' version of 'Fly On The Windscreen' was included as an album track on Black Celebration the following year.

Alan Wilder stated in the documentary: 

"I remember I was vehemently against it, because I felt it was really going backwards, it was so poppy and trite, and he had other songs that were much better, like Fly On The Windscreen, because that was the B-side. It was a much, much stronger song, and I tried to argue to get it flipped over to become the A-side, but I think the first word is "death", and Neil Ferris said "NO". And I was outvoted, really, but I wasn't happy about it, and I sulked for a long time."

Music Video 
The music video for 'It's Called A Heart' is directed by Peter Care.

Track listings
All tracks are written by Martin L. Gore.

UK 7-inch single
A. "It's Called a Heart" – 3:48
B. "Fly on the Windscreen" – 5:03

UK 12-inch single
A. "It's Called a Heart" (Extended) – 7:19
B. "Fly on the Windscreen" (Extended) – 7:47

UK double 12-inch single
A. "It's Called a Heart" (Extended) – 7:19
B. "Fly on the Windscreen" (Extended) – 7:47
C. "It's Called a Heart" (Slow Mix) – 4:49 (remixed by Gareth Jones)
D. "Fly on the Windscreen" (Death Mix) – 5:06 (remixed by Gareth Jones)

Double discs with the cover reading "Special Limited Edition Twin Set Costing No More Than Two Pounds & Ninety Nine Pence" with tracks 1 and 2 on the first record and tracks 3 and 4 on the second record, tracks 3 and 4 being exclusive to the limited edition.

US 12-inch single
A1. "It's Called a Heart" (Emotion Remix) – 6:48 (remixed by Joseph Watt)
A2. "It's Called a Heart" (Emotion Dub) – 5:33 (remixed by Joseph Watt)
B1. "Flexible" (Deportation Mix) – 4:38 (remixed by Bert Bevans)
B2. "It's Called a Heart" – 3:48

UK CD single (1991)
 "It's Called a Heart" – 3:48
 "Fly on the Windscreen" – 5:03
 "It's Called a Heart" (Extended) – 7:19
 "Fly on the Windscreen" (Extended) – 7:47
 "Fly on the Windscreen" (Death Mix) – 5:06

Released as part of the 3 (Singles 13–18) box set.

German and French CD single (1990)
 "It's Called a Heart" (Extended) – 7:19
 "Fly on the Windscreen" (Extended) – 7:47
 "It's Called a Heart" (Slow Mix) – 4:49 (remixed by Gareth Jones)
 "Fly on the Windscreen" (Death Mix) – 5:06 (remixed by Gareth Jones)

Charts

References

External links
 Single information from the official Depeche Mode website
 AllMusic review 

1985 singles
1985 songs
Depeche Mode songs
Mute Records singles
Song recordings produced by Daniel Miller
Songs written by Martin Gore
UK Independent Singles Chart number-one singles